Óscar Javier González Marcos (born 12 November 1982), known simply as Óscar, is a Spanish former professional footballer who played as an attacking midfielder.

He appeared in 267 La Liga matches over nine seasons, scoring a combined 40 goals for Valladolid (two spells) and Zaragoza. He also spent two years in Greece, with Olympiacos.

Club career

Early years
Born in Salamanca, León, Óscar began his career with Real Valladolid, making his first-team – and La Liga – debut in the 1–0 home win over UD Las Palmas on 7 October 2001, one month shy of his 19th birthday. Establishing himself as a regular by the start of the 2002–03 season, he was the side's best scorer in the following year at 10, in spite of a final relegation.

Zaragoza
Subsequently, Óscar moved to Real Zaragoza where he was a regular fixture throughout four seasons, whether as a starter or a substitute. His best scoring output came during his first season, with six goals (two being in a 2–2 draw at CA Osasuna).

Olympiacos
After Zaragoza's relegation in 2007–08, Óscar joined Olympiacos F.C. on a three-year deal during the summer transfer window, joining countryman Ernesto Valverde's roster. During his two-year spell, he played in a total of 68 games and netted nine times, but his performances were irregular overall.

Helping to the Piraeus club to the double in his debut campaign, Óscar also scored in the UEFA Cup, in a 1–2 away loss against AS Saint-Étienne (2–5 on aggregate) for the round of 32.

Return to Valladolid
On 1 September 2010, Olympiacos parted ways with Óscar, who signed a one-year contract with his first professional club Valladolid, now playing in the Segunda División. On 20 July 2011, he signed a two-year extension with the option of making his link a permanent one. 

Óscar netted 14 goals in the 2011–12 season, as the Pucelanos returned to the top flight after two years. Playing more as a second striker in 2014–15, he bettered that total to 16 as the team again competed in the second tier.

Honours
Olympiacos
Superleague Greece: 2008–09
Greek Football Cup: 2008–09

References

External links

1982 births
Living people
Sportspeople from Salamanca
Spanish footballers
Footballers from Castile and León
Association football midfielders
La Liga players
Segunda División players
Tercera División players
Real Valladolid Promesas players
Real Valladolid players
Real Zaragoza players
Super League Greece players
Olympiacos F.C. players
Spain youth international footballers
Spanish expatriate footballers
Expatriate footballers in Greece
Spanish expatriate sportspeople in Greece